Glyphodactyla femoralis is a species of beetle in the family Carabidae, the only species in the genus Glyphodactyla.

References

Lebiinae